Carl-Olov Skeppstedt (1922–1996) was a Swedish film editor. He edited more than ninety films including three films with Ingmar Bergman.

Selected filmography

 The Poetry of Ådalen (1947)
 Pippi Longstocking (1949)
 The Devil and the Smalander (1949)
 The Realm of the Rye (1950)
 A Ghost on Holiday (1951)
 The Clang of the Pick (1952)
 Kalle Karlsson of Jularbo (1952)
 In Lilac Time (1952)
 For the Sake of My Intemperate Youth (1952)
 Unmarried Mothers (1953)
 Ursula, the Girl from the Finnish Forests (1953)
 Sawdust and Tinsel (1953)
 Dance, My Doll (1953)
 A Night in the Archipelago (1953)
 No Man's Woman (1953)
 Taxi 13 (1954)
 Storm over Tjurö (1954)
 The Yellow Squadron (1954)
 Young Summer (1954)
 The Vicious Breed (1954)
 Far och flyg (1955)
 Dreams (1955)
 Paradise (1955)
 People of the Finnish Forests (1955)
 The Girl in Tails (1956)
 Night Child (1956)
 The Minister of Uddarbo (1957)
 Mother Takes a Vacation (1957)
 A Dreamer's Journey (1957)
 Never in Your Life (1957)
 Fridolf Stands Up! (1958)
 The Phantom Carriage (1958)
 The Wedding Day (1960)
 Good Friends and Faithful Neighbours (1960)
 Adventures of Nils Holgersson (1962)
 Äktenskapsbrottaren (1964)
 Docking the Boat (1965)
 Ön (1966)
 Woman of Darkness (1966)
 Stimulantia (1967)
 The Vicious Circle (1967)
 Language of Love (1969)
 The Lustful Vicar (1970)
 Blushing Charlie (1970)

References

Bibliography
 Steene, Birgitta. Ingmar Bergman: A Reference Guide. Amsterdam University Press, 2005.

External links

1922 births
1996 deaths
Swedish film editors
People from Stockholm